Steve Herman may refer to:

 Steve Herman, onetime member of the punk band Crass
 Steve Herman (EPA), formerly a senior administrator at the Environmental Protection Agency
 Steven L. Herman (born 1959), White House bureau chief for the Voice of America